The name Bernice has been used for five tropical cyclones in the Eastern Pacific Ocean.
 Tropical Storm Bernice (1962), landfall in Baja California
 Tropical Storm Bernice (1965), formed south of Puerto Angel, Mexico; no landfall
 Hurricane Bernice (1969), no landfall
 Tropical Storm Bernice (1973), landfall southwest of Zihuatanejo
 Tropical Storm Bernice (1977), formed southeast of Acapulco; no landfall

Pacific hurricane set index articles